Ralph McPate (born 10 October 1940) is a former soccer player who played as a winger. Born in Scotland, he represented Canada at international level.

Club career
Born in Airdrie, Scotland, McPate began his career playing with Airdrieonians and Third Lanark. He moved to Canada at the age of 19, combining his playing career with a job in a surveyor's practice. He played locally in Toronto, for the Ontario team, and in inter-provincial competitions. In 1968, he played in the Toronto and District Soccer League with Toronto Emerald.

In 1969 he played in the National Soccer League with Toronto Italia. That same season he also played for the Rochester Lancers in the American Soccer League.

International career
He gained Canadian citizenship, and earned 4 caps for the national team in 1968, scoring 2 goals. He also represented Canada at the 1967 Pan American Games.

Later life
McPate returned to Scotland in the early 2000s, living in Edinburgh.

References

1940 births
Living people
Footballers from Airdrie, North Lanarkshire
Scottish footballers
Scottish emigrants to Canada
Canadian soccer players
Canada men's international soccer players
Pan American Games competitors for Canada
Footballers at the 1967 Pan American Games
Association football wingers
Airdrieonians F.C. (1878) players
Third Lanark A.C. players
Toronto Italia players
Rochester Lancers (1967–1980) players
Canadian National Soccer League players
American Soccer League (1933–1983) players